Formula Vee is one of the oldest classes in SCCA and competed in the first SCCA National Championship Runoffs.

Formula Vee was first introduced at the Runoffs in 1964 at Riverside International Raceway. The first edition was won by Lewis Kerr. The following decades saw many racing drivers compete in various different racing chassis. Michael Varacins is the most successful driver in the class winning seven times, at five different tracks. Varacins also builds his own chassis.

During the early years of the class the Zink were far superior winning five straight; the chassis won ten total championships. The Lynx chassis name was later changed to Caracal. The Lynx/Caracal chassis has won the most of any other chassis at twelve championships.  Later in the class history, the introduction of the Vortech chassis in 2001 started an era of dominance. The chassis type won the race eight consecutive years in a row with three different drivers.

Race winners

See also
 Formula Vee

References

Vee
Sports Car Club of America